Tokyo Pro Wrestling is the name of two unrelated Japanese professional wrestling promotions. Despite their common name, they did not share management, promotional style, or talent in any way.

Original Tokyo Pro Wrestling
The original Tokyo Pro Wrestling operated from 1966 to 1967.

In mid-1966, Japan Wrestling Association president Michiharu Toyonobori resigned his position and left the promotion, taking along with him some talent, including Katsuhisa Shibata (father of current New Japan Pro-Wrestling star Katsuyori Shibata) and the future Rusher Kimura (Masao Kimura). Antonio Inoki, who was coming back from a long excursion to the United States, chose to join him and create a new venture, Tokyo Pro Wrestling.

Tokyo Pro's biggest rising star was Inoki, who feuded with Johnny Valentine over the "United States" heavyweight title (as Valentine had held  in California, Michigan and Ontario, he was "recognized" as champion by Tokyo Pro so as to lose the belt to Inoki). Inoki's feud with Valentine cemented him not only as a rising star, but also as a tough wrestler who could take on anyone, any style, anywhere.

Nevertheless, problems between Toyonobori and his business backers led him and Isao Yoshiwara to dissolve the promotion in 1967 and replace it with Kokusai Puroresu Kaisha (International Wrestling Enterprise/International Pro Wrestling), which would promote on a larger scale in Japan and eventually become the third most important men's promotion, after New Japan and All Japan, which would appear in 1972.

Tokyo Pro-Wrestling is also the place where Haruka Eigen, who was still active into his 60s wrestling for Pro Wrestling Noah, debuted. He joined Inoki and Shibata in going back to JWA.

Alumni

Natives
Toyonobori
Antonio Inoki
Masanori Saito
Masao Kimura
Masaru Eigen
Katsuhisa Shibata
Sankichi Takasakiyama (Shoji Kai)
Tsuyoshi Sendai (Tokyo Joe/Joe Daigo)
Mammoth Suzuki
Mr. Suzuki/Matty Suzuki

Foreigners
Johnny Valentine
Johnny Powers
Sonny Myers
Dean Higuchi
Stan Stasiak
Lucky Simunovich
Mysterious Medico (Lou Newman)
Steve Stanlee

New Tokyo Pro Wrestling
The new version of Tokyo Pro Wrestling was started by former All Japan Pro Wrestling and Super World of Sports wrestler Takashi Ishikawa in 1994, and it was one of the many independents that arose following SWS's collapse. In 1996 they found a businessman by the name of Kotaro Ishizawa who was willing to bankroll the promotion using his bike messenger business, which enabled Ishikawa to bring foreigners, namely Abdullah the Butcher, 2 Cold Scorpio, and Sabu. It was their peak year, when they were able to hold feuds against WAR and UWFI, but economic problems relating to Kotaro Ishizawa's business' collapse sent Tokyo Pro Wrestling on a downward spiral.

The promotion was briefly reborn as Shin (New) Tokyo Pro Wrestling but remained in an even bigger obscure status. One of its top trainees, Shigeo Okumura, ended up spending more time competing for AJPW and eventually joined it in 2000, following the Pro Wrestling Noah split.

See also

Professional wrestling in Japan

References

External links
"The Damnedest Company", a description of the 90's Tokyo Pro Wrestling promotion, by Masanori Horie
Original Tokyo Pro Wrestling statistics
90's Tokyo Pro Wrestling statistics

versions of the NWA US title
Japanese professional wrestling promotions
1966 establishments in Japan
1967 disestablishments in Japan